Leiolepis rubritaeniata, Reeves's butterfly lizard, is a species of agamid native to Thailand, Laos, Cambodia and Vietnam.

Reproduction
L. rubritaeniata is oviparous.

References

Leiolepis
Reptiles described in 1961
Taxa named by Robert Mertens